Belloc is a surname. Notable people with this surname include:

 Jean-Hilaire Belloc (1786–1866), French painter
Auguste Belloc (1800–1867), French erotic photographer
 Louise Swanton Belloc (1796–1881), French translator and early feminist 
 Marie Belloc Lowndes (1868–1947), English novelist and sister of Hilaire
 Hilaire Belloc (1870–1953), British-French writer
Elaine Belloc, fictional character in the DC/Vertigo Comics series Lucifer